Colapinto is a surname. Notable people with the surname include:

 David K. Colapinto (born 1958), American attorney
 Franco Colapinto (born 2003), Argentine racing driver
 Griffin Colapinto (born 1998), American surfer
 John Colapinto (born 1958), Canadian journalist, author, and novelist